Events from the year 1747 in Denmark.

Incumbents
 Monarch – Frederick V
 Prime minister – Johan Ludvig Holstein-Ledreborg

Events

 4 September – The coronation of Frederick V of Denmark at Frederiksborg Chapel.

Date unknown
 Count Adam Gottlob Moltke was made a privy councillor by Frederick V, who gave him the estate of Bregentved.
 Skagen's first lighthouse is inaugurated to designs by Philip de Lange.

Births
 10 July – Princess Wilhelmina Caroline of Denmark, electress of Hesse-Kassel (died 1820 in Germany)
 4 August – Olfert Fischer, vice admiral (died 1829)
 4 December – Ernst Heinrich von Schimmelmann, politician, businessman and patron (died 1831)

Deaths

References

 
1740s in Denmark
Denmark
Years of the 18th century in Denmark